Wilmer Eduardo Valderrama (born January 30, 1980) is an American actor, producer, and television personality. He is known for his role as Fez in the sitcom That '70s Show (1998–2006), Agustín Madrigal in Encanto, and as Carlos Madrigal in From Dusk till Dawn: The Series (2014–2016). He was also host of the MTV series Yo Momma (2006–07), the voice of Manny in the children's show Handy Manny (2006–2013) and has had recurring roles on Grey's Anatomy as well as The Ranch (both in 2016). He is currently part of the main cast of NCIS, portraying Special Agent Nick Torres.

Valderrama has further performed in several prominent feature films, including Party Monster (2003), Beauty Shop (2005), Fast Food Nation (2006), Unaccompanied Minors (2006), Larry Crowne (2011), and The Adderall Diaries (2015). He voiced the character of Prince Philippe Charming in the family animated film Charming (2018).

In addition to his acting career, Valderrama tours extensively as Global Ambassador for the United Service Organizations (USO), works with the voting rights organization Voto Latino, and co-founded the non-profit Harness.

Early life
Valderrama was born in 1980 in Miami, Florida, to Balbino A. and Sobeida Valderrama. His father is Venezuelan and his mother is Colombian.

Career

Television and film career
Valderrama got his start performing in numerous plays, including A Midsummer Night's Dream and Rumors. He made his professional debut in a Spanish-language Pacific Bell commercial. At his drama teacher's suggestion, he got an agent and was cast in the CBS miniseries Four Corners and in Omba Mokomba on the Disney Channel. He made his big-screen debut in the film Summer Catch.

Valderrama played Fez on That '70s Show from 1998 to 2006; he was a senior in high school when the pilot episode was filmed. He played DJ Keoki in the 2003 film Party Monster. He produced and hosted the MTV series Yo Momma from 2006 to 2007, and appeared three times on Punk'd, hosted by fellow That '70s Show alumnus Ashton Kutcher.

In April and May 2003, Valderrama appeared in the Los Angeles Times critic's choice play Blackout, an adaptation of the feature film Drunks, and on April 4, 2004, starred in the Actors' Fund of America one-performance only reading of Sunset Boulevard. He filmed the short film La torcedura in which he played the lead, and appeared in The Darwin Awards, an independent film directed by Finn Taylor.

In animation work, Valderrama voiced Rodrigo in Clifford's Really Big Movie. He also voices the main character, Manny, in Disney Channel's Handy Manny series for preschoolers. He had a starring role in El Muerto, an indie film directed by Brian Cox and based on the comic book created by Javier Hernandez. In January 2007, Valderrama launched his own men's fashion label called "Calavena". His production company is WV Entertainment.

In 2010, Valderrama guest-starred on Disney Channel's series Wizards of Waverly Place playing the role of Theresa Russo's brother, Ernesto. In 2011, he appeared in three episodes of USA Network's Royal Pains as Eric Kassabian, an art dealer. In 2012, Valderrama co-hosted Premios Juventud as a superhero on July 19, 2012. In August 2012, he appeared in house music group Nomads' music video of "Addicted to Love".

On September 27, 2013, Valderrama won an ALMA Award for Outstanding Social Activism. By late November 2013, Valderrama had joined the cast of From Dusk till Dawn: The Series.

On June 16, 2016, Valderrama joined NCIS in its fourteenth season. He is a series regular as NCIS Special Agent Nicholas Torres. This led to crossover appearances on spin-offs NCIS: New Orleans and NCIS: Hawaiʻi.

Wilmer also voiced Gaxton in the 2020 Disney/Pixar animated feature film, Onward. In 2021 he lent his voice to the Disney animated film Encanto. In December 2021, Wilmer was set to executive produce and star in an untitled Zorro series for Disney Branded Television. On April 30, 2022, it was announced that Valderrama would have a guest appearance in the follow-up sitcom, That '90s Show.

Music career
On May 11, 2011, Valderrama released the song "The Way I Fiesta," which he performed as his alter ego, Eduardo Fresco. The video was directed by Akiva Schaffer from the group The Lonely Island. Danny Masterson, Valderrama's co-star from That '70s Show, has a cameo appearance in the video. Valderrama appeared in the 2009 music video for Wisin & Yandel's song "Imagínate". He also appeared in and produced the 2011 video for LMFAO's song "Sexy and I Know It." At the Billboard Latin Music Awards, he said that he is making music which he will release in Spanish and English. On July 27, 2012, he interviewed Latina and said that he is recording tracks and is working with great artists/producers from both the English and the Spanish side. He said he was hoping to release more music in 2013. On March 10, 2014, Valderrama revealed that a Salud Part 2 is in the works and that he has his music coming out towards the end of the summer of 2014.

Activism and philanthropy

United Service Organizations 
Since 2007, Valderrama has taken part in multiple tours on behalf of the USO. He has traveled more than 46 times and made hosting appearances in locations including Bagram air base in Afghanistan, as well as Iraq, Germany, Poland, South Korea, and Bahrain. In 2021, Valderrama was named a USO Global Ambassador along with singer Kellie Pickler.

Harness 
In 2017, Valderrama co-founded Harness with America Ferrera and Ryan Piers Williams, with the stated goal of improving representation in historically marginalized communities. The non-profit's Be Counted campaign encourages the Latino community to complete and return U.S. census forms.

Voto Latino 
Valderrama has worked with the voting rights non-profit Voto Latino since the organization was formed in 2004. The organization promotes increased voter participation and conducts voter registration drives at cultural events. Valderrama currently serves on the organization's impact council.

Congressional Hispanic Caucus Institute 
Between 2009 and 2012, Valderrama served as the spokesperson for the Congressional Hispanic Caucus Institute's Ready to Lead program.

Essential Voices with Wilmer Valderrama 
In July 2021, Valderrama launched Essential Voices with Wilmer Valderrama, an iHeartRadio podcast highlighting the experiences of essential workers.

Personal life
Valderrama met Mandy Moore when she was 15, and they dated when she was "16 or 17." Valderrama, who is four years her senior, later claimed that Moore had lost her virginity to him, which she denied. In 2004, Valderrama dated Lindsay Lohan, who was 18 at the time; he was 24. From 2010 to 2016, he was in an on-and-off relationship with Demi Lovato. The two met when Lovato was 17 and Valderrama was 29, though they did not begin dating until she turned 18. Lovato would later release the song "29" (2022), which was widely interpreted as a condemnation of Valderrama now that the singer herself was 29, although Lovato did not directly confirm the inspiration and simply stated, "I feel like the song says it all".

In January 2020, Valderrama became engaged to Amanda Pacheco, who is eleven years his junior. In December 2020, the couple announced they were expecting their first child. Their daughter was born on February 15, 2021.

Valderrama is a car collector. He has retained the original model 1969 Oldsmobile Vista Cruiser used in That '70s Show, purchased for $500 upon learning that the show was going to cease production.

Filmography

Film

Television

Director

Music videos

Discography

Singles

Guest appearances

Music videos

As lead artist

As featured artist

Awards
 (2022) (NHMC Impact Awards Gala) (Trailblazer Impact Award)
 Nominated – Imagen Foundation Award for Best Supporting Actor in a Film
Teen Choice Award for Choice TV Sidekick (2003, 2005, 2006) 
 Nominated – Teen Choice Award for Choice TV Sidekick (2002, 2004) 
 Nominated – ALMA Award for Outstanding Actor in a Comedy Series (1999, 2000, 2001, 2002, 2006) 
 Nominated – Young Artist Award for Best Performance in a TV Series by a Young Ensemble (1999) 
 Imagen Foundation Award for Best Supporting Actor – Television (2019)

References

External links

 

1980 births
Living people
American male film actors
American male television actors
American male voice actors
Hispanic and Latino American male actors
American people of Colombian descent
American people of Venezuelan descent
Male actors from Los Angeles
Male actors from Miami
William Howard Taft Charter High School alumni
20th-century American male actors
21st-century American male actors
American television producers